Hugo Carrillo Cavero, also Ugo Facundo Carrillo (Anco-Huallo, Chincheros, Apurímac, October 30, 1956) is a Quechua poet, singer-songwriter, singer, anthropologist and Peruvian politician, congressman for the department from Huancavelica, and belongs to Peru Wins.

Biography 
Hugo Carrillo was born in the Uripa community in the Anco-Huallo district, Apurímac. He completed his secondary studies at the national educational institution Juan Espinoza Medrano, and his university studies at the Universidad Nacional Mayor de San Marcos in the career of anthropology. It was received in 1982.

Hugo Carrillo is the author of several Quechua songs and poems that he published in the poetry books Yaku unupa yuyaynin (2009) and Puyupa wayrapa ninapawan musqukusqanmanta (2010).

References 

1956 births
Living people
Members of the Congress of the Republic of Peru
Peruvian Nationalist Party politicians
People from Apurímac Region
20th-century Peruvian male singers
20th-century Peruvian singers